The 2016 Iowa Corn 300 was the 10th Round of the 2016 Verizon IndyCar Series season and the 10th consecutive year the Verizon IndyCar Series visited the Newton, Iowa short oval. The race was broadcast on NBCSN with Brian Till as the Lap-By-Lap Announcer. Ryan Hunter-Reay of Andretti Autosport entered as the defending winner of the race.

Race Summary
The race was moved to a Sunday afternoon due to the Saturday Night slot on NBCSN taken up by the Quaker State 400 of the 2016 NASCAR Sprint Cup Series. Qualifying saw Simon Pagenaud take his fifth pole of the season while also giving Team Penske its 500th pole position across all series. Ryan Hunter-Reay started 20th, and would have to climb through the field to repeat his victory. The race started on schedule with Josef Newgarden taking the lead from Pagenaud and leading the first 50 laps. As pit stops began to cycle through, the lead would shuffle to Pagenaud, then to Max Chilton, and then Alexander Rossi, before Newgarden returned to the lead. The race saw its first yellow flag when defending winner Ryan Hunter-Reay suffered an engine failure on lap 108 and came to a halt on track. The caution flag ended Newgarden's chance to lap the field, as many previously lapped cars were waved around to the tail end of the lead lap. The race restarted on lap 128, where Newgarden once again began to pull away from the field. Caution flew once more on lap 179, when Juan Pablo Montoya suffered an engine failure and, like Hunter-Reay, came to a stop on course. The race returned to green flag racing on lap 188.  The third and final caution came for a spin by Max Chilton in turn 2 on lap 246, which bunched the field up for a 40 lap sprint to the end. Newgarden, however, was still untouchable and cruised away to win by over four seconds over Will Power, despite suffering a broken wrist the previous weekend at Texas Motor Speedway. Only five cars remained on the lead lap by the time the checkered flag fell.

Newgarden's 282 laps led set a record for most laps led in a Verizon IndyCar Series race. His victory also moved him up to second place in the championship, making him a serious contender to take victory. Chevrolet was dominant again, as they had been for much of the season, with the top four positions all going to Chevrolet powered cars. Mikhail Aleshin's fifth place finish made him the highest placed Honda driver. Alexander Rossi was the highest placed rookie in the field, coming in sixth. It was his best finish since his Indianapolis 500 victory. Only three drivers retired during the race; Juan Pablo Montoya, Conor Daly, and Ryan Hunter-Reay, all with engine related issues.

Results

Qualifying

Source

Race Results

Notes
 Points include 1 point for leading at least 1 lap during a race, an additional 2 points for leading the most race laps, and 1 point for Pole Position.

Source for time gaps:

Championship standings after the race

Drivers' Championship standings

 Note: Only the top five positions are included.

References

External links
 Official Pit Stop Data
 Official Race Broadcast

Iowa Corn 300
2016 Iowa Corn 300
Iowa Corn 300